The Child Citizenship Act of 2000 (CCA) is a United States federal law that amended the Immigration and Nationality Act of 1965 regarding acquisition of citizenship by children of US citizens and added protections for individuals who have voted in US elections in the mistaken belief that they were US citizens. The law modified past rules for child citizenship. Under the CCA, certain children born outside the US who did not obtain citizenship at birth may obtain citizenship automatically after admission as permanent residents (CCA § 101) or may be eligible for expeditious naturalization (CCA § 102). The act also implemented protections for some individuals who have voted or claimed to be US citizens as a result of a good faith mistake (CCA § 201).

The Act is known as Public Law 106-395. CCA § 101 is implemented in INA § 320, codified at 8 U.S.C. § 1431. CCA § 102 is implemented in INA § 322, codified at 8 U.S.C. § 1433. The CCA modified INA §§ 101(f), 212(a)(10)(D), 212(a)(6)(C), 237(a)(6), and 237(a)(3)(D); 8 U.S.C. § 1101(f), 1182(a)(10)(D), 1182(a)(6)(C), 1227(a)(6), and 1227(a)(3)(D). The CCA also modified 18 U.S.C. §§ 611 and 1015.

Title I–CITIZENSHIP FOR CERTAIN CHILDREN BORN OUTSIDE THE UNITED STATES

Section 101. AUTOMATIC ACQUISITION OF CITIZENSHIP FOR CERTAIN CHILDREN BORN OUTSIDE THE UNITED STATES

The following requirements must be met for automatic citizenship:

 The child must have at least one U.S. citizen parent by birth or naturalization
 The child must be under 18 years of age (at the time the law took effect, the child had to be born no earlier than February 27, 1983)
 The child must be living in the legal and physical custody of the U.S. citizen parent
 The child must be in the US in lawful permanent resident status.

Adopted children are also covered if they meet the definition of child found at INA § 101(b)(1); 8 U.S.C. ¢ 1101(b)(1).

This section of the CCA was implemented as INA § 320; 8 U.S.C. § 1431.

Children who become citizens automatically do not receive any documentation of their status. They may apply for a US passport as evidence of status. They may also apply for a Certificate of Citizenship from USCIS using Form N-600 but this is not a requirement.

Section 102. ACQUISITION OF CERTIFICATE OF CITIZENSHIP FOR CERTAIN CHILDREN BORN OUTSIDE THE UNITED STATES

The following requirements must be met for expeditious naturalization:

 The child must have at least one parent who is a citizen of the United States by birth or naturalization
 The US citizen parent must have been physically present in the United States or its outlying possessions for a period or periods totaling not less than five years, at least two of which were after attaining the age of fourteen years; or the US citizen must have a citizen parent who has been physically present in the United States or its outlying possessions for a period or periods totaling not less than five years, at least two of which were after attaining the age of fourteen years
 The child must be under the age of eighteen years
 The child must be residing outside of the United States in the legal and physical custody of the citizen parent
 The child must be temporarily present in the United States pursuant to a lawful admission and must be maintaining such lawful status

Expeditious naturalization allows children of US citizens whose parents do not have the required physical presence to pass on citizenship to use their grandparents' physical presence instead to qualify for US citizenship. It also serves as an alternate path to US citizenship for children of US citizens who did not acquire citizenship at birth and who are not immigrating to the US as lawful permanent residents. The application is made using USCIS Form N-600K. Upon approval, the child enters the US, usually as a visitor with a B-2 visa, to attend an immigration appointment and oath ceremony. Upon taking the oath, a Certificate of Citizenship is issued.

Adopted children are also covered if they meet the definition of child found at INA § 101(b)(1); 8 U.S.C. ¢ 1101(b)(1).

This section of the CCA was implemented as INA § 322; 8 U.S.C. § 1433.

Section 103. CONFORMING AMENDMENT

This section repealed former INA § 321.

Section 104. EFFECTIVE DATE

The effective date of the Child Citizenship Act is February 27, 2001. Children who meet the requirements of the Act on that date automatically became U.S. citizens. Children who were 18 years of age or older on that date did not acquire U.S. citizenship from the Child Citizenship Act of 2000.

Title II–PROTECTIONS FOR CERTAIN ALIENS VOTING BASED ON REASONABLE BELIEF OF CITIZENSHIP

Non-citizens are prohibited by law from voting in US federal elections. 18 U.S.C. § 611 makes unlawful voting a felony. Unlawful voting in any election is also evidence of bad moral character (INA § 101(f); 8 U.S.C. § 1101(f)), a ground of inadmissibility (INA § 212(a)(10)(D); 8 U.S.C. 1182(a)(10)(D)), and a ground of removability (INA § 237(a)(6); 8 U.S.C. § 1227(a)(6)). Falsely claiming citizenship is also prohibited. 18 U.S.C. § 1015 makes a false claim to US citizenship for the purposes of obtaining any Federal or State benefit or US employment a felony. A false claim to US citizenship is also a ground of inadmissibility (212(a)(6)(C)(ii); 8 U.S.C. § 1182(a)(6)(C)(ii)) and a ground of removability (INA § 237(a)(3)(D); 8 U.S.C. § 1227(a)(3)(D)). Congress was concerned that individuals in the US from childhood might mistakenly believe they were US citizens. To deal with the extremely harsh consequences for individuals with a good faith but mistaken belief in their citizenship, Section 201 of the CCA established protections if certain conditions are met.

Good moral character

The CCA amended the good moral character definition at INA § 101(f); 8 U.S.C. § 1101(f) to protect individuals who registered to vote or voted if they meet the requirements.

Inadmissibility

The CCA amended the inadmissibility ground at INA § 212(a)(10)(D); 8 U.S.C. § 1182(a)(10)(D) to protect individuals who voted and also amended the inadmissibility ground at INA § 212(a)(6)(C)(ii); 8 U.S.C. § 1182(a)(6)(C)(ii) to protect individuals who may have falsely claimed to be US citizens if they meet the requirements.

Removability (Deportation)

The CCA amended the removability ground at INA § 237(a)(6); 8 U.S.C. § 1227(a)(6) to protect individuals who voted and also amended the removability ground at INA § 237(a)(3)(D); 8 U.S.C. § 1227(a)(3)(D) to protect individuals who may have falsely claimed to be US citizens if they meet the requirements.

Federal criminal prosecution

The CCA amended the criminal code at 18 U.S.C. § 611 to protect individuals who voted and also amended the criminal code at 18 U.S.C. § 1015 to protect individuals who may have falsely claimed to be US citizens if they meet the requirements.

Requirements for protection under the CCA for mistake of citizenship

The protections found in Title II of the CCA apply only if:

 Both parents (either natural or adoptive) is or was a US citizen whether by birth or naturalization
 The noncitizen was residing permanent in the US since prior to turning 16 years old
 The noncitizen reasonable believed they were a US citizen

Effective date for Title II of the CCA

Unlike Title I, which took effect in 2001, the changes to the INA in Title II apply to anyone applying for a benefit or subject to prosecution on or after September 30, 1996.

Efforts to overturn the act 
Adoptee organizations are in the process of gathering support from legislators to pass Adoptee Citizenship Act of 2021, which would allow all adoptees to be automatically granted U.S. citizenship regardless of age. Adopted children from overseas who turned 18 years or older before 2000 may be not aware they need apply for citizenship due to misinformation from adoption agencies or because of negligent or abusive parents, which can cause those who are adopted to be at risk for deportation.

One of the most well known cases was the deportation of Adam Crapser, who was adopted from South Korea. He endured abuse and also abandonment by two sets of adoptive parents, which none of them filed for his citizenship. Crapser, who had arrests on his record, including domestic violence and an arrest for a sex crime against a minor, was deported in 2016.

In popular culture 

 Blue Bayou, a film written and directed by Justin Chon, depicts a Korean-American man who was adopted by a white family and is at risk for deportation because his parents did not file for his citizenship. The movie is based on true stories about interracial adoption, which is related to the Child Citizenship Act of 2000.

See also 

Deportation of Korean adoptees from the United States

References

External links 
Text of the Act, from U.S. Department of Homeland Security Citizenship and Immigration services
Information about the Act from the U.S. Department of State

Acts of the 106th United States Congress
United States federal immigration and nationality legislation
Childhood in the United States